Construction robots  are a subset of industrial robots used for building and infrastructure construction at site. Despite being traditionally slow to adopt new technologies, 55% of construction companies in the United States, Europe, and China now say they use robots on job sites. Most of the robots working on jobsites today are designed to remove strains on humans, e.g., excavating and lifting heavy objects. Robots that survey and layout markers, tie rebar, and install drywall are also now on the market. 

Other robots are being developed to perform tasks such as finishing the exterior, steel placement, construction of masonry wall, reinforcement concrete, etc. The main challenge to use robots in site is due to limitation in workspace.

Features
General features include:
It must be able to move.
 It must be able to handle components of variable size and weight.
 It must be able to adjust with changing environment.
 It must be able to interact with its surroundings.
 It must be able to perform multiple tasks.

Capabilities
Construction robots have been tested to carry out the followings:
 Building walls
Monitor the construction progress
 Inspection robots are used to investigate the infrastructures, mainly at dangerous locations

Notable construction by robots
 30 storied Rail City Building at Yokohama, Japan was constructed by an automated system.
 Concrete floor finish robot was used by Kajima and Tokimec companies in Japan.
 Obayashi Corporation in Japan has developed and used a system to lay concrete layers in dam construction.

Social impact
Use of the construction robots in the USA is rare, mainly due to opposition from labour unions. However, in Japan, these robots are taken positively.

See also
Industrial robots

References

Robotics